State Road 22 (SR 22) is an east–west discontinuous state road in the central part of the US state of Indiana. The western end of the western segment is in the town of Burlington, at SR 29. The highway passes through rural areas of Carroll and Howard counties, before ending in Kokomo. The eastern segment begins at an interchange with U.S. Route 31 (US 31) and US 35, in Kokomo, and heads east passing through towns and cities like Greentown, Gas City and Upland, before ending at SR 26. The western segment of SR 22 is concurrent with US 35 from Kokomo to Interstate 69 (I-69).

The originally designated road along modern SR 22 was SR 35, running between Kokomo and SR 11 (now SR 9), with SR 22 being routed between SR 16 (now SR 62) and Indianapolis. In the mid-1920s the state of Indiana renumber its state road system and the SR 22 designated was moved to an alignment, between Illinois state line and US 52. In the early 1930s SR 22 was moved to its contemporary alignment, running between SR 29 and US 27 at the time. The concurrency with US 35 was added in the mid-1930s between Burlington and Jonesboro. In the late 1930s SR 22 was moved to a new alignment between Hartford City and the Ohio state line. The entire road was paved before the late 1960s. The road east of SR 26 was removed in the 1970s. Between 2014 and 2016, the Indiana Department of Transportation (INDOT) relinquished the road through Kokomo.

Route description

Western segment
The western segment of SR 22 begins at an intersection between Michigan Street (SR 29) and 7th Street, in the town of Burlington. The street heads northeast, leaving Burlington, before bending to become east-west heading towards Kokomo. On its way to Kokomo SR 22 passes through rural Carroll and Howard counties before an intersection with Malfalfa Road. The SR 22 designation ends at this intersection but the roadway continues east towards downtown Kokomo as Sycamore Street.

Eastern segment 

The eastern segment of SR 22 begins at an intersection with US 31 and US 35 on the east side of Kokomo. SR 22 heads due east concurrent with US 35, passing through agriculture properties. The concurrency has an intersection with SR 19 at this intersection SR 19 heads east concurrent with US 35/SR 22. The highway enters Greentown passing through downtown before an intersection with the northern end of SR 213. East of Greentown the road has a four-way stop with SR 13, at this intersection SR 19 turns north concurrent with SR 13. Past SR 13 the road has an intersection with SR 37, southwest of the Marion Municipal Airport, before passing just south of the airport. The road has an intersection with SR 9, before curving northeast, passing just north of Jonesboro.

US 35 and SR 22 crosses over a Norfolk Southern railroad track before bending to become east-west and having an intersection with SR 15. East of SR 15 the concurrency cross over the Mississinewa River before entering Gas City, in Gas City US 35/SR 22 is concurrent with Main Street. East of the river Main Street cross a railroad track and enters downtown Gas City. East of downtown Main Street passes through residential properties becoming commercial properties. The road has an interchange with I-69, at this interchange US 35 turns south concurrent with I-69. Past I-69, SR 22 leaves Gas City entering rural Grant County, passing farms and fields. The road has an intersection with the southern end of SR 5 before curving to become north-south and entering Upland. In Upland SR 22 is on Main Street, passing through mostly commercial properties. Main Street crosses over a railroad track, passing houses before passing on the east side of Taylor University. SR 22 end at an intersection with SR 26 on the southeast corner of the university.

History
Prior to 1926 SR 22 was on an alignment between SR 16, now SR 62, and Indianapolis, passing through Bloomington. At this time SR 35 was routed along modern SR 22 from Kokomo to SR 11, now SR 9, while the segment of SR 22 in Jay County was part of SR 23. SR 23 went between Pennville and US 27 between Portland and Bryant. In 1926 SR 22 was proposed between the Illinois state line and US 41 in Boswell, while SR 22 was commissioned between US 41 and US 52 along the modern route of SR 352. The route of modern SR 22 between Kokomo and SR 9 became part of SR 18, while the section of SR 22 in Jay County also became part of SR 18. SR 22 was commissioned from the Illinois state line to US 41, along modern SR 26, between 1928 and 1929.

Many changes to the SR 22 designation happen in 1931 the first being SR 22 between Illinois state line and US 41 became part of SR 26, while the segment of road from US 41 and US 52 became SR 152. SR 22 was proposed between SR 25 near Lafayette and SR 29. The final changes in 1931 was SR 22 was designated between SR 29 and US 27. The proposed section of SR 22 west of SR 29 was removed from any proposals between late 1932 and 1933. US 35 was commissioned to follow SR 22 from SR 29 to Gas City between 1934 and 1935. In either 1938 or 1939 SR 22 from Hartford to Pennville was moved north onto a new road to the state road system. At this time SR 22 was added between US 27 and the Ohio state line, connecting to Ohio State Route 219. The concurrency with US 35, between SR 29 and Kokomo, was removed in between 1939 and 1941. The last section of SR 22 to be paved was the section in eastern Blackford County, being paved in either 1969 or 1970.

The eastern terminus of SR 22 was moved from the Ohio state line to SR 26 near Upland, removing SR 22 from Blackford and Jay counties, between 1976 and 1977. The former route of SR 22 in Blackford and Jay counties became county roads. On June 27, 2014, INDOT stated that "pending contract approval" they would transfer 5.8 miles of SR 22 to the city of Kokomo, from the western city limits to the US 31/35 interchange which opened in 2013. This gap in SR 22 was first noted in INDOT's 2016 Reference Post Book.

Major intersections

References

External links

022
Transportation in Howard County, Indiana
Transportation in Grant County, Indiana
Transportation in Carroll County, Indiana